The World Championship Air Race is a series of air races sanctioned by the World Air Sports Federation (FAI).  Originally established in 2003 as the Red Bull Air Race, and created by Red Bull GmbH, the event involves competitors navigating a challenging obstacle course in the fastest time. Pilots fly individually against the clock and have to complete tight turns through a slalom course consisting of pylons, known as "Air Gates".

The races are held mainly over water near cities, but are also held at airfields or natural wonders. They are accompanied by a supporting program of show flights. Races are usually flown on weekends with the first day for qualification then knockout finals the day after. The events attract large crowds and are broadcast, both live and taped, in many nations.

At each venue, the top eight places earn World Championship points. The air racer with the most points at the end of the Championship becomes Red Bull Air Race World Champion.

After a three-year hiatus for safety improvements and reorganisation, the Air Race resumed in 2014.

In May 2019 Red Bull announced the cancellation of the Red Bull Air Race after 2019 and the shortening of the 2019 race calendar to four races.

In February 2021, the FAI announced a new promoter will revive the FAI-sanctioned air racing series in 2022, the World Championship Air Race.  World Championship Air Race intends to change race aircraft with sustainable fuels, electric drivetrains and electric Vertical Take-off and Landing (eVTOL) airplanes from 2024 (the third season).  The contract is for fifteen years.

Alternative lighter aircraft racing events involving soft wing aircraft such as the Parabatix Sky Racers are following in the footsteps of the Red Bull air race while paving a new direction for a different kind of air race with more emphasis on ground-skimming precision flying and out-of-cockpit pilot interaction.

History

The Red Bull Air Race was conceived in 2001 in the Red Bull sports think-tank which has been responsible for creating a range of new sports events across the world. The aim was to develop a new aviation race that would challenge the ability of the world's best pilots, creating a race in the sky that was not simply about speed, but also precision and skill. The answer was to build a specially designed obstacle course which the pilots would navigate at high speeds.

Development of the prototypes of what are now known as the 'Air Gates' began in 2002 and renowned Hungarian pilot Péter Besenyei successfully completed the first test flight through them. After two years in planning and development, the first official Red Bull Air Race was ready to take off in Zeltweg, Austria in 2003. A second was staged the same year near Budapest in Hungary.

In 2004, three races took place in Kemble (England), Budapest (Hungary) and Reno (USA).
The series was expanded in 2005 to become the Red Bull Air Race World Series. Ten pilots competed in seven races around the world – Mike Mangold was crowned the champion with Péter Besenyei and Kirby Chambliss in second and third place respectively.
Eight races took place in 2006 with 11 pilots competing. Kirby Chambliss was crowned the champion for the Series' second season.
In 2007 the calendar was extended to include ten races with the first race on South American soil taking place in Rio de Janeiro. Mike Mangold reclaimed the title of Red Bull Air Race World Champion 2007. 12 pilots took part in 2008 in eight races around the globe and Austrian pilot Hannes Arch became the first European to win the championship. The largest number of pilots so far took part in six races in 2009. 15 pilots from 12 different countries competed for the world championship title, this time with Brit Paul Bonhomme coming out on top, after coming so close the previous two years.

In the 2010 series, during training runs prior to the race, Brazilian pilot Adilson Kindlemann crashed his plane into the Swan River in Perth. Rescuers were on site within seconds and Kindlemann was rushed to Royal Perth Hospital where it was determined that he had suffered no serious injury. , it is the only crash in the history of the Red Bull Air Race.

2011, 2012 and 2013 series cancelled
The 2011 series of races worldwide was cancelled. The decision was taken by Red Bull on 27 July 2010 to allow for a "headquarters" restructure as well as the implementation of new safety measures.

The 2012 series was also cancelled;
"There will be no races in 2012, that’s true," said Red Bull Air Race Team spokesperson Nadja Zele in an email message to AOPA. "A revamped concept and a fixed race calendar will be revealed in 2013."

Eventually, the 2013 series was cancelled as well. However, in October 2013, it was announced that the Red Bull Air Race World Championship would return in 2014. Training for the upcoming season took place at Olney airport in Texas. The Championship finally returned in Abu Dhabi on 28 February 2014.

Revival with New Promoter in 2022 
With dwindling corporate interest, Red Bull decided not to continue the Red Bull Air Race World Championship beyond the 2019 season.

In February 2021, the World Air Sports Federation announced a new promoter, Willie Cruickshank, and his Air Race World Championship organisation.  The series intends to begin in 2022.

In February 2022, the first race of the new series was announced when Air Race announced they had signed a 3 year deal with Indonesia. Other host cities are expected to be announced in the coming weeks.

For 2022, the World Championship Air Race would've been hosted in Jakarta, Indonesia on October 14–16, 2022 among other rounds on the planned calendar. However, the 2022 season was cancelled due to COVID and the current economic situation.

Format
In earlier seasons, 2005 and 2006, pilots first ran two qualifying rounds to determine starting order, with the fastest time starting last. The race was then run over two rounds, and the combined time of both rounds determines the winner. Starting in 2007, a new knock-out format was introduced which was modified for 2008.

Flying sessions
Training: Takes place on the days preceding Qualifying Day. There are two training days each consisting of two training sessions. Pilots must take part in at least two mandatory training sessions. Time of final training session (training 4) determines the starting order for Qualifying.
Qualifying: Takes place on Qualifying Day, the day before Race Day. Includes two mandatory qualifying sessions. Best time counts.
Round of 14: Takes place on Race Day. The fastest seven from each heat and the fastest loser compete for a place in the Round of 8. Results in the Round of 14 determine 9th to 14th place race positions.
Round of 8: Eight fastest from Round of 14 compete in the Round of 8. The fastest four pilots from each heat advance to the Final 4. Results in the Super 8 determine 5th to 8th place race positions.
Final 4: Four fastest from the Super 8 compete in the Final 4 for 1st, 2nd, 3rd and 4th place race positions.

Starting order

The starting order is the order in which the pilots will race in each flying session. The starting order for Training is defined by the results of the last year's Red Bull Air Race World Championship standings. The highest ranking pilot starts first. Starting order for new race pilots is determined by a draw. The starting order for Qualifying is defined by the results of the fourth training session. The order is reversed so that the slowest pilot from the fourth training session starts first. The starting order for all sessions on Race Day is determined by the results in Qualifying. The order is reversed so that the slowest pilot from Qualifying starts first.

World Championship points
Based on the pilot's place at each race, World Championship points are awarded. The current points scoring format see first place receive 25 points, second place receive 22, on through thirteenth who receives one.

Rules
Pilots are required to complete the  track and fly between the Air Gates following a predetermined race track configuration. Failure to do this correctly results in penalty seconds being added to their race time. Penalty seconds can be added for an incorrect passing of an Air Gate or passing an Air Gate at an incorrect orientation. For more serious breaches of the rules, pilots may be ruled as "Did Not Finish" or disqualified.

Three different gate types require a specific manner of crossing. Double cone gates must be crossed in level flight, single cone gates must be crossed in a 90° angle, and slalom flying through the chicane gates (knife or level flying not mandatory).

Penalties are incurred for violations of the rules, as follows.

3 second penalty
Hitting a gate (1st time)
Hitting a gate (2nd time)

2 second penalty

 Flying too high, through or over an Air Gate
 Incorrect level (at an angle) crossing through an Air Gate

1 second penalty
 Insufficient or no smoke

Did Not Finish
 Deviating from course
 Exceeding  when crossing the Start Gate
 Aircraft weight below  after the race
 Exceeding 10g for more than 0.6 seconds
 Exceeding maximum load factor of 12g
 Hitting a gate (3rd time)

Disqualification
 Uncontrolled movements or flight
 Close to ground pull-up from descent
 Crossing safety line
 Negative g-turn around a pylon
 Flying below  between Air Gates
 Flying into clouds
 Entering course at an angle exceeding 45 degrees
 Ignoring Race Director commands

Aircraft

The competitors use high-performance aerobatic planes such as the Zivko Edge 540, MXS-R, and the Corvus Racer 540, equipped with Lycoming engines.

Competitors have tuned their aircraft for better performance. However, the safety implications of engine or airframe failures mean that performance tuning by individual teams, though commonly done in motorsports, is strictly limited in scope.

Each aircraft carries a TL elektronic TL-3424_EXT accelerometer. It transmits timing and speed data which is picked up and  displayed on large spectator screens.

Air Gates

The first prototype pylon was developed by Martin Jehart of Bellutti Protection Systems, an Austrian engineering firm specializing in the manufacturing of technical materials and tarpaulin. They initially used a latex balloon for crash tests and aerodynamic studies and after many tests and research settled on the use of a combination of different materials, the crucial component being spinnaker ripstop nylon, an extremely lightweight and flexible material used for making sails for boats. This would prove to be a breakthrough in the development of the Air Gates producing a pylon that would rip instantaneously when hit by a plane. Over 70 tests of the pylon were carried out on the ground using a car with a wing strapped on the roof before they were ready to undergo tests with a real plane. Eight different cars were used in these tests as well as a trailer and truck. Hungarian pilot, Péter Besenyei worked closely with the team and attempted the first deliberate pylon hit in early 2003 with positive results. The first Air Gates, which were cylindrical, were finally ready to be used at the very first Red Bull Air Races held in Austria and Hungary later that year.

The Air Gates play a vital role in the Red Bull Air Race, but must also fulfill complex and contradictory demands. They have to be delicate enough to burst apart the instant they are touched by an aircraft and sturdy enough to remain stationary in all weather conditions, including stormy weather and strong winds. The early cylindrical pylons fulfilled the first criterion but proved to be too unstable in the wind.

The answer came in 2004 with the cone design. Inside the Air Gate a relatively high, and carefully monitored, pressure level is maintained with the use of powerful electrical, petrol-powered blowers that help keep the Air Gates steady even in windy conditions.
Over the years the Air Gate design has developed and improved and today's Air Gates can withstand wind speeds of up to  without being blown over. Their stability is further reinforced with 12 ground attachments, each strong enough to hold . For races over water, the Air Gates are secured to a floating barge which has stability anchors.

Unlike early models, the current structures are made up of six sections attached together by zippers and Velcro to allow quick replacement if damaged by a plane. Prior to May 2008, the races had used more than eight tons of fabric for the various pylons, and the average life of each pylon was 15 races. Thirty-five pylons are transported to each race, and at each race's completion, the pylons are sent to Innsbruck, Austria to be repaired.

If a pylon is hit by the plane, it is designed to break apart, preventing it from harming the plane and pilot. The damaged parts of the pylon are replaced by course personnel nicknamed "Air Gators". It usually takes a few minutes to replace a pylon. The record for the setup of a replacement pylon is 1 minute 30 seconds, set in 2007.

Champions

Elite/Master Class

Challenger Class

Most wins

Elite/Master Class

Challenger Class

Pilots

Elite/Master Class

Race locations

1 The 11th round of the 2007 season in Acapulco, Mexico was cancelled.
2 The 4th round of the 2006 season in St. Petersburg, Russia was cancelled.
3 The 5th round of the 2007 season in Barcelona, Spain was cancelled.
4 The 4th round of the 2008 season in Stockholm, Sweden was cancelled.
5 The season finale of the 2016 season in Las Vegas, United States was cancelled.
6 Race in Spain was cancelled.
7 Cancelled
8 Cancelled
9 Race location was Liberty State Park in Jersey City.
10 Race in China was cancelled. Replaced by Austria.
11 Race in Russia was cancelled. Replaced by Croatia.

In video games
 The Red Bull Air Race is featured as a playable mini-game in a special dedicated "Red Bull space" for PlayStation Home released on 8 January 2009.
 The Red Bull Air Race is also featured as an advanced mission in Microsoft's Flight Simulator X.
 The Red Bull Air Race is now a game for Apple's iPod Touch/iPhone. 
 The Red Bull Air Race: The Game announced for PC version will featured the high-end desktop graphics, other console not yet to be confirmed. PC version will release in 2016, developed by Slightly Mad Studios and published by Wing Racers Games Sports.

See also
 Competition aerobatics
 List of motorsport championships
 Reno Air Races

References

External links 

  – Official website

 
Air racing
Air Race World Championship
Aerobatic competitions
World championships in aerial sports
Recurring sporting events established in 2003